The 24th International Film Festival of India was held during 10-20 January 1993 at New Delhi.

The festival was made interim non-competitive following a decision taken in August 1988 by the Ministry of Information and Broadcasting. The earlier "Filmotsavs" and IFFI 90-91-92 together constituted previous 23 editions of the festival.

Non-Competitive Sections
Cinema of The World
Indian Panorama - Feature Films
Indian Panorama - Non-Feature Films
Indian Panorama - Mainstream Films

References

1993 film festivals
24th
1993 in Indian cinema